Jack de Mello (November 15, 1916 – April 27, 2019) was an American composer, arranger, producer, and recording artist from Hawaii. He was known for being a composer and advocate of Hawaiian music.

Jack de Mello composed music for animated television series including The Flintstones and The Jetsons. He was the father of Jon de Mello.

References 

1916 births
2019 deaths
American centenarians
Men centenarians
American composers
Record producers from Hawaii
Hawaiian music